Seán Nealon is a retired Irish sportsperson. He played hurling with his local club Burgess and was a member of the Tipperary senior inter-county team in 1991.
He was an unused substitute in the Tipperary team that won the 1991 All-Ireland Senior Hurling Championship Final.

References

Teams

Living people
Burgess hurlers
Tipperary inter-county hurlers
Year of birth missing (living people)